César di Candia (born 24 October 1929 in Florida) is a Uruguayan journalist and writer.

He developed a long-lasting career in several relevant periodicals: El País, Lunes, El Dedo, Guambia, Repórter, Hechos, La Mañana, Marcha, Búsqueda. 

He interviewed notorious politicians involved in the civic-military dictatorship. The interview to the retired General Hugo Medina in which he revealed giving orders to torture was a landmark in Uruguayan journalism. 

His literary works reflect his experience in written media.

Selected works
Non-fiction
Ni muerte ni derrota (1987, republished in 2006)
El viento nuestro de cada día (1989)
Los años del odio (1993)
La generación encorsetada (1994)
Grandes entrevistas uruguayas (editor, 2000)
Sólo cuando sucumba (2003)
Tiempos de tolerancia, tiempos de ira (2005)
Fiction
El país del deja, deja (1996)
Resucitar no es gran cosa (1997)
Concierto para doble discurso y orquesta (2003)
El pleito de la Princesa de Gales y otros relatos (2016)

References

1929 births
Living people
Uruguayan journalists
Uruguayan male writers